Arthrochilus lavarackianus, commonly known as the glaucous truffle orchid, is a species of flowering plant in the orchid family (Orchidaceae) and is endemic to the Torres Strait and Tropical North Queensland. It has one or two bluish green leaves at its base and up to fifteen greenish, insect-like flowers with red glands on its mushroom-like labellum. This species is known by some authorities as Phoringopsis lavarackiana.

Description
A. lavarackianus is a terrestrial, perennial, deciduous, sympodial herb with an underground tuber which produces daughter tubers on the end of root-like stolons. The petals and lateral sepals turn backwards against the ovary and are inconspicuous. Flowering occurs from January to August.

Taxonomy and naming
The glaucous truffle orchid was first formally described in 2004 by David Jones and given the name Phoringopsis lavarackiana from a specimen collected on Moa Island. The description was published in The Orchadian. In 2006, Bill Lavarack changed the name of this orchid to Arthrochilus lavarackianus.

Distribution and habitat
The glaucous truffle orchid grows in scrub on Moa Island and in Tropical North Queensland as far south as the Mutjati country of Shelburne Bay.

Ecology
As with other Arthrochilus orchids, A. lavarackianus is pollinated by male thynnid wasps of the genus Arthrothynnus although the species involved is not known. It also reproduces asexually by producing new tubers.

References

lavarackianus
Plants described in 2004
Orchids of Queensland
Orchids of Papua New Guinea